Jaibón is a municipal district of the municipality of Laguna Salada, located northwest in the Valverde Province of the Dominican Republic. It is a small town, dedicated to agriculture and livestock.

Populated places in Valverde Province